Darul Aman Highway or Lebuhraya Darul Aman, Federal Route 1 is a major highway in Kedah, Malaysia.

List of interchanges

See also
 Federal Route 1

Highways in Malaysia